A Thing Called Love is the 39th overall album by country singer Johnny Cash, released on Columbia Records in 1972 (see 1972 in music). The title song, written by Jerry Reed, was released successfully as a single (with "Daddy" as the B-side), reaching No. 2 on the country charts; two more singles charted as well, while the album itself also reached No. 2 on the country album charts. "A Thing Called Love" was re-recorded by Cash for Classic Cash: Hall of Fame Series (1988), while "Tear Stained Letter" was reprised on American IV: The Man Comes Around (2002). The Canadian pressing of this album has a different version of "Kate" with altered lyrics.

Track listing

Personnel
 Johnny Cash – vocals, guitar
 The Evangel Temple Choir – backing vocals
 The Carter Family – backing vocals
 Marshall Grant – bass guitar
 W.S. Holland – drums
 Bob Wootton, Carl Perkins, Ray Edenton, Jerry Reed – guitar
 Tommy Allsup – acoustic guitar
 Charlie McCoy – harmonica
 Bill Pursell – piano
 Larry Butler – producer, piano, arrangements on "A Thing Called Love" and "Papa Was a Good Man"
 Don Tweedy – arrangement on "Tear Stained Letter"
Technical
Don Tweedy - producer on "Tear Stained Letter"
 Charlie Bragg, Lou Bradley – engineers
Bill Barnes - cover
Al Clayton - front and back cover photography
Don Wolf - cover photography

Charts

Weekly charts

Year-end charts

Singles

Covers
The title song was covered by Elvis Presley on his 1972 album He Touched Me.

References

External links
 Luma Electronic entry on A Thing Called Love

Johnny Cash albums
1972 albums
Columbia Records albums
Albums produced by Larry Butler (producer)